Aphelochaeta antelonga is a species of bitentaculate cirratulidan first found in the Pacific coast of Costa Rica, at a shallow subtidal depth of about  in the Gulf of Nicoya. It is characterised by possessing a long biannulate peristomium and fibrillated capillary setae.

References

Terebellida